Sikha Chatterjee is an Indian politician from Bharatiya Janata Party. In May 2021, she was elected as a member of the West Bengal Legislative Assembly from Dabgram-Phulbari constituency in Jalpaiguri district. She defeated Trinamool Congress heavyweight and Transport Minister of West Bengal Goutam Deb with the margin of 27,593 votes. She was the opposition leader of Rajganj Panchayat Sammittee. She was former leader of All India Trinamool Congress.

References 

Living people
Year of birth missing (living people)
21st-century Indian politicians
Jalpaiguri district
Bharatiya Janata Party politicians from West Bengal
West Bengal MLAs 2021–2026

People from Jalpaiguri district